Adolfo Pérez y Muñoz (18 July 1864 - 21 December 1945) was a Spanish prelate of the Roman Catholic church who served as Bishop of Córdoba.

Biography
He was born in Cantabria , entered the seminary at a young age and was ordained a priest at the age of 24. On 29 April 1909 Pope Pius X named him Bishop of Canarias in the Canary Islands, he took up the position on 3 October that year. Four years later he was appointed Bishop of Badajoz on 18 July 1918, and he was assigned to Córdoba 11 July 1920.

Death
He died on 21 December 1945 while serving as Bishop in Córdoba, Spain.

See also
 Roman Catholic Diocese of Canarias
 Roman Catholic Archdiocese of Mérida-Badajoz
 Roman Catholic Diocese of Córdoba

References

Spanish Roman Catholic bishops
Bishops appointed by Pope Pius X
1864 births
1945 deaths